Parāśara (Sanskrit: पराशर;) was a maharshi and the author of many ancient Indian texts. He is accredited as the author of the first Purana, the Vishnu Purana, before his son Vyasa wrote it in its present form. He was the grandson of Vasishtha, the son of Śakti Maharṣi. There are several texts which give reference to Parāśara as an author/speaker. The various texts attributed to him are given in reference to Parāśara being the speaker to his student.

Etymology 
When Parāśara's father, Sakti Maharishi died after being devoured by the king Kalmashapada along with Vashistha's other sons, Vashistha resorted to ending his life by suicide. Hence he jumped from Mount Meru but landed on soft cotton, he entered a forest fire only to remain unharmed, then he jumped into the ocean who saved him by casting him ashore. Then he jumped in the overflowing river Vipasa, which also left him ashore. Then he jumped into the river Haimavat, which fled in several directions from his fear and was named Satadru. Then when he returned to his asylum, he saw his daughter-in-law pregnant. When a son was born he acted as his father and hence forgot completely about destroying his life. Hence, the child was named Parāśara which meant enlivener of the dead.

Genealogy
According to the Vedas, Brahma created Vasishtha(reborn to Mitra-Varuna), who, with his wife Arundhati, had a son named Śakti Mahariṣhi who sired Parāśara. With Satyavati of Kaivartta clan Parāśara is father of Vyasa. Vyāsa sired Dhritarashtra and Pandu through his deceased step brother's wives, Ambika and Ambalika and Vidura through a hand-maiden of Ambika and Ambalika. Vyāsa also sired Shuka through his wife, Jābāli's daughter Pinjalā. Thus Parāśara was the biological great-grandfather of both the warring parties of the Mahābhārata, the Kauravas and the Pandavas.

Legends

There is a story of Rishi Parāśara: Śakti Maharṣi died in his early age. This  made Vasishtha, his father live in his hermitage with Adrushyanti (wife of Shakti Maharishi). Vasistha heard the chanting of the Vedas and Adrushyanti told him that Vedic hymn sounds were coming from the child of his son, Sakti, that was developing in her womb. Vasistha was happy to hear this. Adrushyanti gave birth to a son and the child grew up to become Parāśara.

Parāśara was raised by his grandfather Vasishtha because he lost his father at an early age. His father, Śakti Muni, was on a journey and came across an angry rākṣasa (demon) who had once been a king but was turned into a demon feeding on human flesh as a curse from Vasishtha.  The demon devoured Parāśara's father. In the Vishnu Purana, Parāśara speaks about his anger from this:

I had heard that my father had been devoured by a Rākṣasa employed by Vishwamitra: violent anger seized me and I commenced a sacrifice for the destruction of the Rākṣasas: hundreds of them were reduced to ashes by the rite, when, as they were about to be entirely exterminated, my grandfather Vasishtha said to me: Enough, my child; let thy wrath be appeased: the Rākṣasas are not culpable: thy father's death was the work of destiny. Anger is the passion of fools; it becometh not a wise man. By whom, it may be asked, is anyone killed? Every man reaps the consequences of his own acts. Anger, my son, is the destruction of all that man obtains by arduous exertions, of fame, and of devout austerities; and prevents the attainment of heaven or of emancipation. The chief sages always shun wrath: be not subject to its influence, my child. Let no more of these unoffending spirits of darkness be consumed. Mercy is the might of the righteous.

Parāśara Muni (Sage) once halted for a night in a little hamlet on the banks of the river Yamuna. He was put up in the house of the fisherman-chieftain Dasharaj. When dawn broke, the chief asked his daughter, Matsyagandha, whose name means "one with the smell of fish", to ferry the sage to his next destination. When in the ferry, Parāśara was attracted by the beautiful girl and asked her to fulfill his desire of giving a son to her. Matsyagandha refused fearing the other people and sages who were standing on the bank of river at the other side.

He then created an island within the river by his mystic potency and asked her to land the boat there. On reaching the other side, the sage once again chanted the mantra to make her pregnant, but she declared that her body stank and  Parāśara granted her the boon that the finest fragrance may emit from her person. She was thereafter known as Satyavati (pure fragrance). Matsyagandha was transformed (by the powers of the sage) into Yojanagandha ("she whose fragrance can be smelled from across a yojana"). She now smelled of musk, and so was called Kasturi-Gandhi ("musk-fragrant"). Then, she insisted that the act of getting a child was not appropriate in broad daylight, as her father and others would see them from the other bank; they should wait till night. The sage, with his powers, shrouded the entire area in fog. Before Parāśara gave her a child, Satyavati again interrupted him to say that he would enjoy his child and depart,   leaving her shamed in society. She asked Parāśara to promise her that the childbirth would be a secret and her secret intact; the son born from their union would be as famous as the great sage, and her fragrance and youth would be eternal. Parāśara granted her these wishes and was satiated by the beautiful Satyavati. Parāśara then  gave her a child who was a son called  Krishna Dvaipāyana was born, who was dark-complexioned and hence may be called by the name Krishna (black) and also the name Dwaipayana, meaning 'island-born'. He later compiled the classic Vedic literatures of India, and so is called Vyasa who is the 17th incarnations of Lord Vishnu. Leaving Satyavati, Parāśara proceeded to perform Tapas (intense meditation). Later Vyasa also became a Rishi and Satyavati returned to her father's house and in due course, married Śantanu.

In Anushasana Parva of Mahabharata, Parāśara told Yudhisthira that he prayed to Shiva. His desire was to obtain a son with great ascetic merit, endued with superior energy, earn world-wide fame, and arrange the Vedas. Shiva appeared and granted him his wishes and in addition, he told him that his son Krishna will be one of the Saptarshis of Savarni manvantara, be immortal by being freed of diseases, and he will be friend of Indra.

Parāśara was known as the "limping sage". He had his leg wounded during an attack on his āśrama. When a ṛṣi dies he merges back into an element or an archetype. When Sage Parāśara was walking through a dense forest he and his students were attacked by wolves. He was unable to get away in his old age with a lame leg and he left this world merging into the wolves.

The Monument of Parāśara Muni is available  at Junha - Panhala fort in Tal Kavathe Mahankal Sangli district of Maharashtra. A cave supposed to be of Parāśāra Muni is present at the fort.

Ṛgveda
In the Ṛgveda, Parāśara, son of Śakti Muni (Parāśara Śāktya), is the seer of verses 1.65-73 which are all in praise of Agni (the sacred fire), and part of 9.97 (v.31-44) which is in praise of Soma. Below is 1.73.2

devo na yaḥ savitā satyamanmā kratvā nipāti vṛjanāni viṣvā
purupraṣasto amatirna satya ātmeva Sevo didhiṣāyyo bhūt

He who is like the divine Sun, who knows the truth (of all things), 
preserves by his actions (his votaries) in all encounters; like nature, 
he is unchangeable and, like soul, is the source of all happiness: he is ever to be cherished.

Texts attributed to Parāśara
Seer of verses in the Ṛgveda: recorded as the seer of RV 1.65-73 and part of RV 9.97.
Parāśara Smṛti (also called Parāśara Dharma Saṃhitā): a code of laws which is stated in the text (1.24) to be for Kali Yuga.
Speaker of Viṣṇu Purana to Maitreya.
It is considered a foundational text of Hindu astrology. 
Speaker of the Vṛkṣāyurveda ("the science of life of trees"), one of the earliest texts on botany. This text was considered to be an ancient botany primer for students of Traditional Indian Medicine.
Krishi Parāśaram, a book that dealt with agriculture and weeds.

Notes

References
 Flood, Gavin (1996). An Introduction to Hinduism. Cambridge: Cambridge University Press. .
 Ganguli, Kisari Mohan.  "The Mahabharata of Krishna-Dwaipayana Vyasa" published between 1883 and 1896, http://www.sacred-texts.com/hin/m12/m12c049.htm
 Monier-Williams, Sanskrit Dictionary (1899).
 Munshi, K.M. "The Book of VedaVyaasa: The Master". Bharatiya Vidya Bhavan, Bombay, 1971.
 Wilson, H. H. (2006). The Vishnu Purana: A System of Hindu Mythology and Tradition. Cambridge: Read Country Books. .
 Translation and commentary Brihat Parāśara Hora Sastra
Translation to Portuguese Brihat Parāśara Hora Shastra

Rishis
Ancient Indian philosophers